World Wide Web topology is the network topology of the World Wide Web, as seen as a network of web pages connected by hyperlinks.

The Jellyfish and Bow Tie models are two attempts at modeling the topology of hyperlinks between web pages.

Models of web page topology

Jellyfish Model

The simplistic Jellyfish model of the World Wide Web centers around a large strongly connected core of high-degree web pages that form a clique; pages such that there is a path from any page within the core to any other page. In other words, starting from any node within the core, it is possible to visit any other node in the core just by clicking hyperlinks. From there, a distinction is made between pages of single degree and those of higher order degree. Pages with many links form rings around the center, with all such pages that are a single link away from the core making up the first ring, all such pages that are two links away from the core making up the second ring, and so on. Then from each ring, pages of single degree are depicted as hanging downward, with a page linked by the core hanging from the center, for example. In this manner, the rings form a sort of dome away from the center that is reminiscent of a jellyfish, with the hanging nodes making up the creature's tentacles.

Bow Tie Model
The Bow Tie model comprises four main groups of web pages, plus some smaller ones. Like the Jellyfish model there is a strongly connected core. There are then two other large groups, roughly of equal size. One consists of all pages that link to the strongly connected core, but which have no links from the core back out to them. This is the "Origination" or "In" group, as it contains links that lead into the core and originate outside it. The counterpart to this is the group of all pages that the strongly connected core links to, but which have no links back into the core. This is the "Termination" or "Out" group, as it contains links that lead out of the core and terminate outside it. A fourth group is all the disconnected pages, which neither link to the core nor are linked from it.

The Bow Tie model has additional, smaller groups of web pages. Both the "In" and "Out" groups have smaller "Tendrils" leading to and from them. These consist of pages that link to and from the "In" and "Out" group but are not part of either to begin with, in essence the "Origination" and "Termination" groups of the larger "In" and "Out". This can be carried on ad nauseam, adding tendrils to the tendrils, and so on. Additionally, there is another important group known as "Tubes". This group consists of pages accessible from "In" and which link to "Out", but which are not part of the large core. Visually, they form alternative routes from "In" to "Out", like tubes bending around the central strongly connected component.

See also 

 Webgraph

References

External links
 Internet Topology Mapping Tools (Mehmet Engin Tozal)
 The Workshop on Internet Topology (WIT) Report
 Perl program that generates synthetic Internet-like topologies
  Computing the unmeasured: An algebraic approach to Internet mapping

Network topology